Although of Course You End Up Becoming Yourself: A Road Trip with David Foster Wallace is a 2010 memoir by David Lipsky, about a five-day road trip with the author David Foster Wallace. It is based upon a Rolling Stone magazine story that received the National Magazine Award.

Lipsky, a novelist and contributing editor at Rolling Stone magazine, recounts his time spent with the author of Infinite Jest at the moment when Wallace realized his work would bring him fame, and that this would change his life. The book was a National Public Radio Best Book of the Year, a New York Times Book Review Editors' Choice, and a New York Times bestseller. 

A feature film adaptation entitled The End of the Tour was released in July 2015. The film has a 92% "Certified Fresh" rating on Rotten Tomatoes, based on 159 reviews. The film also holds a score of 82 out of 100 on Metacritic, based on 35 reviews, indicating "universal acclaim".

Story
Lipsky, who received a National Magazine Award for writing about Wallace in 2009, here provides the transcript of, and commentary about, his time accompanying Wallace across the country just as Wallace was completing an extensive "book tour" promoting his novel, Infinite Jest. The format captures almost every moment the two spent together – on planes and cars, across the country — during the specific time period when Wallace was becoming famous; the writers discuss literature, popular music and film, depression, the appeals and pitfalls of fame, dog ownership, and many other topics.

Reception
Although of Course You End Up Becoming Yourself was positively received by critics. In Time magazine, Lev Grossman wrote, "The transcript of their brilliant conversations reads like a two-man Tom Stoppard play or a four-handed duet scored for typewriter." The Atlantic Monthly called the work, "far-reaching, insightful, very funny, profound, surprising, and awfully human"; at National Public Radio, Michael Schaub described the book as "a startlingly sad yet deeply funny postscript to the career of one of the most interesting American writers of all time", calling it  "crushingly poignant, both endearing and fascinating. At the end, it feels like you've listened to two good friends talk about life, about literature, about all of their mutual loves". Newsweek noted, "For readers unfamiliar with the sometimes intimidating Wallace oeuvre, Lipsky has provided a conversational entry point into the writer's thought process. It's odd to think that a book about Wallace could serve both the newbies and the hard-cores, but here it is." Publishers Weekly, in a starred review, described the book as "a rollicking dialog ... a candid and fascinating glimpse into a uniquely brilliant and very troubled writer". The Wall Street Journal called it "lovely", and Laura Miller in Salon described it as "exhilarating". Maria Bustillos, in an essay for The Awl, wrote, "I can't tell you how much fun this book is ... It's a road picture, a love story, a contest: two talented, brilliant young men with literary ambitions, and their struggle to understand one another." "Spurred by a rapidly developing feeling of friendship toward Lipsky", wrote critic Richard Brody in The New Yorker, "Wallace speaks of himself with a profuse, almost therapeutic candor, delivering a spoken autobiography ... In Lipsky's book, Wallace's voice is startlingly present, but so are his ideas, his immediate emotional responses to circumstances, and his own complex range of perspectives on the circumstances at hand ... His remarks to Lipsky are as quietly hilarious as they are ingenious."

The book was a New York Times bestseller, New York Times Editors' Choice, and a National Public Radio Best Book of the Year.

The End of the Tour
A feature film adaptation of Although of Course You End Up Becoming Yourself, The End of the Tour, was released in July 2015, with Academy Award-nominated actor Jesse Eisenberg portraying Lipsky and Jason Segel portraying Wallace. In his review for The New York Times, critic A.O. Scott wrote, "I love it", adding, "You hang on its every word and revel in its rough, vernacular beauty ... There will always be films about writers and writing, and this one is just about as good as it gets."

The film received a 92% "Certified Fresh" rating on Rotten Tomatoes, based on 159 reviews, with an average rating of 8.02/10. The site's critical consensus states: "Brilliantly performed and smartly unconventional, The End of the Tour pays fitting tribute to a singular talent while offering profoundly poignant observations on the human condition." The film also holds a score of 82 out of 100 on Metacritic, based on 35 reviews, indicating "universal acclaim". At Rogerebert.com, critic Brian Tallerico called the film a "joy", and "stunning ... a gift of highly intellectual discussion between two brilliant people at turning points in their lives", while also praising Jason Segel and Jesse Eisenberg.

The Washington Posts Ann Hornaday gave the film four out of four stars and called it, "A five-day conversation you won't want to end ... Part love story, part road trip, part elegy to a bygone, pre-9/11 age, 'The End of the Tour' brims with compassion and sharply honed insight" about "what it means to be human". In his review for Vanity Fair, Richard Lawson called it a "wise, humbly sublime film ... a profound, and profoundly affecting, movie, one that had me blubbering with happy-sad tears. What a pleasure to spend two hours in its company."

In his review for the New York Daily News, Joe Neumaier awarded the film five out of five stars, calling it "one of the best movies of the year ... Director James Ponsoldt's smart, incisive and extraordinary drama is the kind of film that burrows into your head and leaves you illuminated about life and how to live it." In her review for the Los Angeles Times, Sheri Linden wrote "James Ponsoldt's magnificent The End of the Tour gives us two guys talking, and the effect is breathtaking."

In his review in the New York Post, Kyle Smith gave the film four of four stars, writing, "The End of the Tour is the best movie you'll see this summer ... It's a glory ... See it with your best friend." In his review for Cut Print Film, Josh Oakley awarded the film a perfect "10/10", calling it "one of the best films of the year", and stating "The End of the Tour presents, with ample evidence, Wallace as a figure who could never fill the holes of loneliness with the spackle of acclaim." In his review for the Chicago Sun-Times, Richard Roeper awarded the film four out of four stars, calling it "brilliant ... this is one of the best movies of the year." In his review for the Minnesota Star Tribune Colin Covert gave the film four out of four stars, writing, "Simply put, it is a masterwork."

The film featured in numerous "Best of 2015" lists, including The New York Times, Vanity Fair, Vogue, The Guardian, Entertainment Weekly, USA Today, Variety, The Washington Post, The New York Post, Huffington Post, Wired, and The New Republic.

Honors
 2010 NPR Best Books of the Year
 2010 New York Times Book Review Editors' Choice
 2010 New York Times bestseller 
 2009 National Magazine Award

References

External links
 New York magazine Book Club and Although of Course You End Up Becoming Yourself
 David Lipsky on The Moment with Brian Koppelman about Although of Course You End Up Becoming Yourself and The End of the Tour
 David Lipsky on The Takeaway about David Foster Wallace – audio clips
 Lipsky at American Fiction Notes for Although of Course You End Up Becoming Yourself
 
 
 
 Rolling Stone magazine David Foster Wallace profile by David Lipsky
 NPR Best Books of 2010 Although of Course You End Up Becoming Yourself
 Richard Brody in The New Yorker on Although of Course You End Up Becoming Yourself and The End of the Tour
 David Lipsky on NPR's On The Media speaking about Although of Course You End Up Becoming Yourself and The End of the Tour 

2010 non-fiction books
Biographies about writers
Autobiographies adapted into films
Broadway Books books